The Tver Constituency (No.179) is a Russian legislative constituency in the Tver Oblast. In 1993-2007 the constituency covered Western Tver Oblast, including the city of Tver, but in 2016 Bezhetsk constituency in Eastern Tver Oblast was extended to Tver and gained the name "Tver constituency", while the territory of former Tver constituency was placed into Zavolzhsky constituency.

Members elected

Election results

1993

|-
! colspan=2 style="background-color:#E9E9E9;text-align:left;vertical-align:top;" |Candidate
! style="background-color:#E9E9E9;text-align:left;vertical-align:top;" |Party
! style="background-color:#E9E9E9;text-align:right;" |Votes
! style="background-color:#E9E9E9;text-align:right;" |%
|-
|style="background-color:"|
|align=left|Tatyana Astrakhankina
|align=left|Communist Party
|
|22.23%
|-
|style="background-color:#0085BE"|
|align=left|Viktor Belov
|align=left|Choice of Russia
| -
|18.60%
|-
| colspan="5" style="background-color:#E9E9E9;"|
|- style="font-weight:bold"
| colspan="3" style="text-align:left;" | Total
| 
| 100%
|-
| colspan="5" style="background-color:#E9E9E9;"|
|- style="font-weight:bold"
| colspan="4" |Source:
|
|}

1995

|-
! colspan=2 style="background-color:#E9E9E9;text-align:left;vertical-align:top;" |Candidate
! style="background-color:#E9E9E9;text-align:left;vertical-align:top;" |Party
! style="background-color:#E9E9E9;text-align:right;" |Votes
! style="background-color:#E9E9E9;text-align:right;" |%
|-
|style="background-color:"|
|align=left|Tatyana Astrakhankina (incumbent)
|align=left|Communist Party
|
|30.75%
|-
|style="background-color:#2C299A"|
|align=left|Valery Rastorguev
|align=left|Congress of Russian Communities
|
|13.99%
|-
|style="background-color:"|
|align=left|Vladimir Shkolnikov
|align=left|Independent
|
|12.33%
|-
|style="background-color:"|
|align=left|Sergey Medennikov
|align=left|Independent
|
|8.31%
|-
|style="background-color:"|
|align=left|Aleksandr Kharchenko
|align=left|Our Home – Russia
|
|7.90%
|-
|style="background-color:"|
|align=left|Vasily Krylov
|align=left|Agrarian Party
|
|4.74%
|-
|style="background-color:#D50000"|
|align=left|Nikolay Kuznetsov
|align=left|Communists and Working Russia - for the Soviet Union
|
|4.10%
|-
|style="background-color:#C28314"|
|align=left|Valery Nekhaev
|align=left|For the Motherland!
|
|2.25%
|-
|style="background-color:"|
|align=left|Mecheslav Sekerzhitsky
|align=left|Independent
|
|1.81%
|-
|style="background-color:"|
|align=left|Yury Boshnyak
|align=left|Independent
|
|1.09%
|-
|style="background-color:#000000"|
|colspan=2 |against all
|
|10.11%
|-
| colspan="5" style="background-color:#E9E9E9;"|
|- style="font-weight:bold"
| colspan="3" style="text-align:left;" | Total
| 
| 100%
|-
| colspan="5" style="background-color:#E9E9E9;"|
|- style="font-weight:bold"
| colspan="4" |Source:
|
|}

1999

|-
! colspan=2 style="background-color:#E9E9E9;text-align:left;vertical-align:top;" |Candidate
! style="background-color:#E9E9E9;text-align:left;vertical-align:top;" |Party
! style="background-color:#E9E9E9;text-align:right;" |Votes
! style="background-color:#E9E9E9;text-align:right;" |%
|-
|style="background-color:"|
|align=left|Tatyana Astrakhankina (incumbent)
|align=left|Communist Party
|
|22.97%
|-
|style="background-color:"|
|align=left|Aleksandr Kharchenko
|align=left|Unity
|
|10.20%
|-
|style="background-color:#1042A5"|
|align=left|Sergey Yushenkov
|align=left|Union of Right Forces
|
|9.89%
|-
|style="background-color:"|
|align=left|Aleksandr Tyagunov
|align=left|Our Home – Russia
|
|7.55%
|-
|style="background-color:"|
|align=left|Yury Parkhaev
|align=left|Independent
|
|6.16%
|-
|style="background-color:#D50000"|
|align=left|Nikolay Kuznetsov
|align=left|Communists and Workers of Russia - for the Soviet Union
|
|4.78%
|-
|style="background-color:"|
|align=left|Natalya Alyabysheva
|align=left|Independent
|
|4.46%
|-
|style="background:"| 
|align=left|Konstantin Klyushkin
|align=left|Yabloko
|
|3.99%
|-
|style="background-color:"|
|align=left|Anatoly Danchenko
|align=left|Independent
|
|2.18%
|-
|style="background-color:"|
|align=left|Sergey Kondrashev
|align=left|Independent
|
|1.93%
|-
|style="background-color:"|
|align=left|Valery Rumyantsev
|align=left|Independent
|
|1.91%
|-
|style="background-color:"|
|align=left|Konstantin Kharchenko
|align=left|Independent
|
|1.40%
|-
|style="background-color:#CC0000"|
|align=left|Gennady Dmitriev
|align=left|Social-Democrats
|
|1.38%
|-
|style="background-color:"|
|align=left|Yevgeny Shamakin
|align=left|Independent
|
|1.22%
|-
|style="background-color:"|
|align=left|Vyacheslav Shmelev
|align=left|Independent
|
|1.14%
|-
|style="background-color:#FCCA19"|
|align=left|Valery Minevich
|align=left|Congress of Russian Communities-Yury Boldyrev Movement
|
|1.02%
|-
|style="background-color:#084284"|
|align=left|Tatyana Pushay
|align=left|Spiritual Heritage
|
|0.96%
|-
|style="background-color:"|
|align=left|Sergey Petrenko
|align=left|Independent
|
|0.49%
|-
|style="background-color:#000000"|
|colspan=2 |against all
|
|14.14%
|-
| colspan="5" style="background-color:#E9E9E9;"|
|- style="font-weight:bold"
| colspan="3" style="text-align:left;" | Total
| 
| 100%
|-
| colspan="5" style="background-color:#E9E9E9;"|
|- style="font-weight:bold"
| colspan="4" |Source:
|
|}

2003

|-
! colspan=2 style="background-color:#E9E9E9;text-align:left;vertical-align:top;" |Candidate
! style="background-color:#E9E9E9;text-align:left;vertical-align:top;" |Party
! style="background-color:#E9E9E9;text-align:right;" |Votes
! style="background-color:#E9E9E9;text-align:right;" |%
|-
|style="background-color:"|
|align=left|Vladimir Vasilyev
|align=left|United Russia
|
|31.39%
|-
|style="background-color:"|
|align=left|Tatyana Astrakhankina (incumbent)
|align=left|Communist Party
|
|18.88%
|-
|style="background-color:"|
|align=left|Maksim Larin
|align=left|Independent
|
|15.63%
|-
|style="background-color:"|
|align=left|Aleksandr Kharchenko
|align=left|Independent
|
|8.68%
|-
|style="background-color:"|
|align=left|Tatyana Agafonova
|align=left|Agrarian Party
|
|3.46%
|-
|style="background-color:#1042A5"|
|align=left|Vladimir Orekhov
|align=left|Union of Right Forces
|
|2.63%
|-
|style="background-color:"|
|align=left|Vladimir Komissarov
|align=left|Independent
|
|2.43%
|-
|style="background-color:#FFD700"|
|align=left|Natalya Alyabysheva
|align=left|People's Party
|
|1.54%
|-
|style="background:"| 
|align=left|Konstantin Klyushkin
|align=left|Yabloko
|
|1.28%
|-
|style="background-color:"|
|align=left|Aleksandr Patsyk
|align=left|Liberal Democratic Party
|
|0.75%
|-
|style="background-color:"|
|align=left|Boris Rybka
|align=left|Social Democratic Party
|
|0.66%
|-
|style="background-color:#00A1FF"|
|align=left|Leonid Musin
|align=left|Party of Russia's Rebirth-Russian Party of Life
|
|0.59%
|-
|style="background-color:#4D8D39"|
|align=left|Aleksandr Bulychev
|align=left|Genuine Patriots of Russia
|
|0.56%
|-
|style="background:#7C73CC"| 
|align=left|Aleksandr Palev
|align=left|Great Russia–Eurasian Union
|
|0.56%
|-
|style="background-color:#164C8C"|
|align=left|Viktor Volkov
|align=left|United Russian Party Rus'
|
|0.18%
|-
|style="background-color:#000000"|
|colspan=2 |against all
|
|8.27%
|-
| colspan="5" style="background-color:#E9E9E9;"|
|- style="font-weight:bold"
| colspan="3" style="text-align:left;" | Total
| 
| 100%
|-
| colspan="5" style="background-color:#E9E9E9;"|
|- style="font-weight:bold"
| colspan="4" |Source:
|
|}

2016

|-
! colspan=2 style="background-color:#E9E9E9;text-align:left;vertical-align:top;" |Candidate
! style="background-color:#E9E9E9;text-align:left;vertical-align:top;" |Party
! style="background-color:#E9E9E9;text-align:right;" |Votes
! style="background-color:#E9E9E9;text-align:right;" |%
|-
|style="background-color: " |
|align=left|Svetlana Maksimova
|align=left|United Russia
|
|53.03%
|-
|style="background-color: " |
|align=left|Aleksey Chepa
|align=left|A Just Russia
|38,080
|18.14%
|-
|style="background-color: " |
|align=left|Anton Morozov
|align=left|Liberal Democratic Party
|28,965
|13.79%
|-
|style="background-color: " |
|align=left|Lyudmila Vorobyova
|align=left|Communist Party
|26,304
|12.53%
|-
|style="background-color:"|
|align=left|Vadim Deshevkin
|align=left|Rodina
|14,168
|6.75%
|-
|style="background-color:"|
|align=left|Ilya Kleymyonov
|align=left|Communists of Russia
|10,381
|4.94%
|-
|style="background-color: " |
|align=left|Igor Alekseev
|align=left|Yabloko
|9,509
|4.53%
|-
| colspan="5" style="background-color:#E9E9E9;"|
|- style="font-weight:bold"
| colspan="3" style="text-align:left;" | Total
| 
| 100%
|-
| colspan="5" style="background-color:#E9E9E9;"|
|- style="font-weight:bold"
| colspan="4" |Source:
|
|}

2021

|-
! colspan=2 style="background-color:#E9E9E9;text-align:left;vertical-align:top;" |Candidate
! style="background-color:#E9E9E9;text-align:left;vertical-align:top;" |Party
! style="background-color:#E9E9E9;text-align:right;" |Votes
! style="background-color:#E9E9E9;text-align:right;" |%
|-
|style="background-color: " |
|align=left|Yulia Saranova
|align=left|United Russia
|62,870
|30.91%
|-
|style="background-color: " |
|align=left|Oleg Lebedev
|align=left|Communist Party
|35,685
|17.54%
|-
|style="background-color: " |
|align=left|Aleksey Chepa
|align=left|A Just Russia — For Truth
|27,376
|13.46%
|-
|style="background-color: " |
|align=left|Ilya Kleymyonov
|align=left|Communists of Russia
|16,125
|7.93%
|-
|style="background-color: " |
|align=left|Aleksandr Borisov
|align=left|New People
|14,434
|7.10%
|-
|style="background-color: " |
|align=left|Dmitry Karpov
|align=left|Liberal Democratic Party
|13,819
|6.89%
|-
|style="background-color: " |
|align=left|Marina Belova
|align=left|Yabloko
|9,408
|4.62%
|-
|style="background-color: " |
|align=left|Aleksandr Antonov
|align=left|Party of Growth
|7,786
|3.83%
|-
|style="background-color: " |
|align=left|Oleg Melnikov
|align=left|Russian Party of Freedom and Justice
|3,982
|1.96%
|-
| colspan="5" style="background-color:#E9E9E9;"|
|- style="font-weight:bold"
| colspan="3" style="text-align:left;" | Total
| 203,421
| 100%
|-
| colspan="5" style="background-color:#E9E9E9;"|
|- style="font-weight:bold"
| colspan="4" |Source:
|
|}

Notes

References

Russian legislative constituencies
Politics of Tver Oblast